The women's individual time trial events in cycling at the 2008 Summer Paralympics took place on 12 September at the Changping Triathlon Venue.

Handcycle class

HC A/HC B/HC C 

The women's individual time trial HC A/HC B/HC C event took place at 10:41.

Cerebral palsy and locomotor disability classes

LC 1/LC 2/CP 4 

The women's individual time trial LC 1/LC 2/CP 4 event took place at 14:56.

LC 3/LC 4/CP 3 

The women's individual time trial LC 3/LC 4/CP 3 event took place at 15:07.

Blind and visually impaired class

B&VI 1–3 

The women's individual time trial B&VI 1-3 event took place at 15:19.

References

Cycling at the 2008 Summer Paralympics
Para